What Becomes of the Broken Hearted? is a 1999 New Zealand drama film directed by Ian Mune and starring Temuera Morrison as an abusive Māori husband, Jake "the Muss" Heke. The film is based on Alan Duff's novel What Becomes of the Broken Hearted? (1996), the sequel to Once Were Warriors (1990), which was made into the film Once Were Warriors (1994).

Plot summary
Jake "the Muss" Heke fights to save his son, Sonny, from a gang lifestyle after his eldest son, Nig, is killed in a gangland shootout. Jake goes through a period of hopelessness as he tries to restore his family to a functioning state after his anger, drinking, and violence (depicted in the first film) tore them apart. He still has trouble accepting the old traditional ways of the Māori people, but he begins to realise the importance of family and regrets what his former actions have done to them. Towards the end of the film, Jake does his best to reconcile with his family, even going so far as to save his son's life despite great personal risk to himself. This action, along with several others, serve to highlight Jake's changing characteristics.

Cast
 Temuera Morrison as Jake "the Muss" Heke
 Rena Owen as Beth Heke
 Julian Arahanga as Nig Heke
 Clint Eruera as Sonny Heke
 Taungaroa Emile as Mark "Boogie" Heke
 Nancy Brunning as Tania Rogers
 Tammy Davis as Mookie
 Eru Potaka-Dewes as Minata Kahu
 Lawrence Makoare as Grunt
 Pete Smith as Apeman
 Rawiri Paratene as Mulla Rota

Performance
What Becomes of the Brokenhearted? enjoyed significant theatrical exposure and, as of 2007, was the fifth highest-grossing New Zealand film in the domestic market.

Critic reviews
Nick Grant of OnFilm Magazine praised the film as being a "sequel that equals" and was maybe better than the original.

New Zealand Film and TV Awards
What Becomes of the Broken Hearted? won nine of its 13 New Zealand Film Award nominations in 1999, including Best Director, Best Screenplay, Best Actor, Best Actress, Best Supporting Actor and Best Original Music.

DVD release 
In Australia, Becker issued the film on a double-disc with the previous film Once Were Warriors.

References

External links

1999 films
1990s New Zealand films
1990s English-language films
Films based on New Zealand novels
Films set in Auckland
Māori-language films
New Zealand drama films
Films about domestic violence
Films scored by David Hirschfelder
1990s gang films
1999 drama films
New Zealand films about revenge
Films about Māori people
Films directed by Ian Mune